Cape St. Mary's (French:Cap-Sainte-Marie) is a community in the Canadian province of Nova Scotia, located in the District of Clare in Digby County . The harbor is home to a $5,000,000 dollar a year fishery that supports a fleet of 42 fish harvesters, 14 vessels, and nine transient ships. In 2014 a hydrographic survey was conducted by the Fisheries and Oceans Canada and found that the harbor was in need of major dredging to protect the local fleet.  Cape St. Mary's is scheduled for a major capital construction project that will improve the harbor by adding a new breakwater and groyne extension.

References

Cape St. Mary's

Communities in Digby County, Nova Scotia
General Service Areas in Nova Scotia